The German Avenue Road is a tree-lined holiday route that runs the length of Germany from Rügen on the Baltic Sea to Lake Constance on its border with Switzerland. The project is supported by the "German Avenue Route Association" (Arbeitsgemeinschaft Deutsche Alleenstraße), whose members are the German Automobile Club ("ADAC"), the German Tourism Association, the German Forest Conservation Society, and other institutions. The forestry scientist, Hans Joachim Fröhlich, was its major proponent.

The aim of the Association is to preserve, protect, and maintain avenues in Germany and to restore old avenues after they were destroyed in many places in recent years by road development and safety projects. The Association says the Route connects "the East with West and North to South [and] is a symbol of German unity and common effort of the people of the old and new federal states for the protection of nature."

Cobblestones still serve as pavement on many avenues in the former East German areas.

The first segment of the German Avenue Road between Rügen Island in the Baltic Sea and Reinsberg was inaugurated on 3 May 1993, progressively completed over the  next several years, and completed on 25 May 2000 with the segment from Ettlingen, near Karlsruhe, to the island of Reichenau in Lake Constance on the German-Swiss border.

History 

The vision for the creation of the German Avenue Road began shortly after German reunification in 1990:

 9 November 1989 – Opening of the Berlin Wall between West and East Berlin.
 3 October 1990 – Reunification of Germany.
 Fall 1990 – ADAC, in its Motorworld magazine, issued an appeal to "Save the Avenues" of the former East Germany.
 Summer 1992 – Foundation established for "German Avenue Route" as a tourist facility and ideal connection between the old and new federal German states.
 3 May 1993 – Opening of the first section between Sellin / Rügen and Rheinberg / Brandenburg
 2 October 1993 – Opening of the second part between Rheinberg / Brandenburg and Wittenberg / Saxony-Anhalt 
 29 September 1994 – Opening of the 3rd section between Wittenberg / Saxony-Anhalt and Goslar / Lower Saxony 
 13 June 1995 – Opening of the 4th section between Goslar / Lower Saxony and Dresden and Plauen / Saxony 
 26 June 1996—Opening of the 5th leg between Duderstadt / Plauen and Fulda  (Lower Saxony, Saxony-Anhalt, Saxony, Thuringia, Hesse) 
 30 April 1997—Opening of the 6th Leg between Meiningen (Thuringia) and Braubach am Rhein (Rhineland-Palatinate) 
 6 May 1998—Opening of the 7th Leg between Braubach (Rhineland-Palatinate) and Karlsruhe / Ettingen (Baden-Wuerttemberg) 
 25 May 2000—Opening of the 8th and final leg from Ettingen to the island of Reichenau in Lake Constance on the border with Switzerland (Baden-Wuerttemberg)

Route

Gallery

Literature 
 Arbeitsgemeinschaft Deutsche Alleenstraße (Hrsg.): Deutsche Alleenstraße – von Rügen bis zum Bodensee. WKP-Verlag, Freilassing 2001 (2nd ed.)
 Baedeker Allianz: Reiseführer Deutschland. Ein As im Ärmel. Verlag Mair-Dumont. November 2009. p. 131f. 
 Thomas Billhardt, Günther Bellmann: Die Deutsche Alleenstraße. Zwischen Rügen und Rheinsberg. Ullstein, Berlin 1996. 
 Thomas Billhardt, Günther Bellmann: Die Deutsche Alleenstraße. Zwischen Rheinsberg und Wittenberg. Ullstein, Munich 2003 (5th ed.). 
 Ulf Böttcher, Wolfgang Hoffmann: Die deutsche Alleenstrasse – von der Insel Rügen bis zum Fläming. Mitteldeutscher Verlag, Halle 1995.

References

External links 
 Arbeitsgemeinschaft Deutsche Alleenstraße e.V.
 Deutsche Alleenstraße im OSM Relation Analyzer

German tourist routes
Avenues (landscape)